Tower of the Dead is the only adventure published by Avalon Hill in 1984 for the fantasy role-playing game Powers & Perils.

Description
Tower of the Dead is a boxed set that contains a 56-page adventure book, and a cardstock gamemaster's screen.

Plot summary
Through a four-part adventure, the player characters become aware that the lich Nilgeranthrib seeks to become ruler of Thaliba, and they must endeavor to destroy him. The four parts of the adventure take place in the city of Porta, near the city, on the road, and in the Tower of the Dead for the final confrontation with the lich.

Publication history
Avalon Hill entered the fantasy role-playing game market with Powers & Perils in 1983. Sales were poor, and only two supplements and one adventure were published. The adventure was 1984's Tower of the Dead, a boxed set designed by Richard Snider, with artwork by Rick Barber, Winchell Chung, Michael Creager, and Bob Haynes. 

Publication of Powers & Perils and its products was discontinued in 1985.

Reception
In issue 24 of Imagine, Mike Dean noted the relatively high price of Tower of the Dead, but still recommended it, saying "Tower of the Dead is a formidable challenge to any experienced group of P&P players and is recommended in spite of what may seem to be a high price."

References

Fantasy role-playing game adventures
Role-playing game supplements introduced in 1984